Byron Marsh (born 29 June 1950) is a Caymanian sailor. He competed in the Star event at the 1992 Summer Olympics.

References

External links
 

1950 births
Living people
Caymanian male sailors (sport)
Olympic sailors of the Cayman Islands
Sailors at the 1992 Summer Olympics – Star
Place of birth missing (living people)